Jette Hansen (born 21 July 1987) is a former female Danish handball player who last played for Silkeborg-Voel KFUM, until 2018.

International honours
EHF Cup Winners' Cup:
Winner: 2016

Individual awards  
 All-Star Left Back of the Danish Handball League: 2015
 Top Scorer of the Danish Handball League: 2015

References

1987 births
Living people
People from Skanderborg Municipality
Danish female handball players
KIF Kolding players
Sportspeople from the Central Denmark Region
21st-century Danish women